Destricted is a British-American anthology film that explores the line where art and pornography intersect. The UK and US film releases had overlapping but different short art-house erotic films. The film collection won awards at a range of international film festivals, including Cannes, Sundance, Edinburgh, Amsterdam and Locarno.

Releases
The UK version released in 2006 runs at 112 minutes and includes seven short films:

 Impaled (Larry Clark) - A casting for a porn film, but not with the insecure women often displayed, instead with insecure young men. (37min 28s).
 Balkan Erotic Epic (Marina Abramović) - An erotic comedy about myths from the Balkans about sex organs. (13 min 04s).
 House Call (Richard Prince) - A vintage sex scene recontextualized with edits and music. (12min 29s).
 Sync (Marco Brambilla) - Consists of very fast cuts from different porn films. (2min 15s).
 Hoist (Matthew Barney) - A juxtaposition of sexuality and industrial machinery. (14min 37s).
 Death Valley (Sam Taylor-Wood) - A man masturbates in the desert. (8min 25s).
 We Fuck Alone (Gaspar Noé) - A man and a woman masturbate to the same porn film in different rooms. (23min 31s).

The US version (2010) runs at 129 minutes and includes eight short films, four from the earlier plus four new ones: Marilyn Minter's Green Pink Caviar, Cecily Brown's Four Letter Heaven, Clark's Impaled, Noé's We Fuck Alone, Prince's House Call, Sante D'Orazio's Scratch This, and Tunga's Cooking. It does not contain Balkan Erotic Epic, Sync, and Death Valley.

Cast
Impaled
 Daniel as himself
 August as herself
 Jasmine Byrne as herself
 Destiny Deville (uncredited) as herself
 Dillan Lauren as herself
 Sativa Rose as herself
 Angela Stone as herself
 Nancy Vee as herself

House Call
 Kora Reed as the Patient
 John Saint John as the Doctor

Hoist
 Vincente Pinho Neto as Blooming Greenman

Death Valley
 Chris Raines

We Fuck Alone
 Shirin Barthel
 Richard Blondel
 Manuel Ferrara
 Katsuni

References

External links
 
 
 
 Destricted film competition

2006 films
2006 drama films
British drama films
American drama films
Films directed by Marco Brambilla
Films directed by Larry Clark
Films directed by Gaspar Noé
Films directed by Sam Taylor-Wood
American anthology films
Films about pornography
American independent films
British independent films
British anthology films
Anthology film series
2000s English-language films
2000s American films
2000s British films